The Symphony No. 8, Op. 362, subtitled Rhôdanienne, is a work for orchestra by French composer Darius Milhaud. The piece was written in 1957 on a commission from the University of California. Its four programmatic movements paint a musical landscape of the course of the Rhone River.

Milhaud's Eighth Symphony has a total running time of about 22 minutes. The titles of the movements, as descriptive of their character as of tempo, are as follows:
 Avec mystère et violence (approx. 5'25")
 Avec sérénité et nochalence (approx. 7'25")
 Avec emportement (approx. 4'30")
 Rapide et majestueux (approx. 4'50")
This symphony is published by Heugel & Cie.

Recordings 
 a stereo recording of the composer conducting the orchestra of French Radio, re-released in 2003 on the Apex label 
 a 1993 all-digital recording by Alun Francis and the Radio-Sinfonieorchester Basel, part of a boxed set of Milhaud's Symphonies No. 1–12 on CPO

References

External links 
Video - Darius Milhaud - Symphony No. 8 (1 of 2) (13:37).
Video - Darius Milhaud - Symphony No. 8 (2 of 2) (09:54).

Symphony 08
1957 compositions